Claude Clerselier (1614, in Paris – 1684, in Paris) was a French editor and translator.

Clerselier was a lawyer in the Parlement of Paris and resident for the King of France in Sweden. He was the brother-in-law of Pierre Chanut, and served as the liaison between René Descartes and Queen Christina of Sweden. He was Descartes's literary executor and edited and translated several works by Descartes, including his letters (Paris, 1657, 1659 et 1667), L'Homme, et un Traité de la formation du fœtus du mesme auteur avec les remarques de Louys de La Forge, 1664, L'Homme...et...Le Monde, 1667, and his Principes, 1681.

Sources 

 Delphine Antoine-Mahut, "Claude Clerselier (1614–1684)", in: The Cambridge Descartes Lexicon, Dir. Larry Nolan, Cambridge University Press, 2015.
 Trevor McClaughlin, "Claude Clerselier's Attestation of Descartes's Religious Orthodoxy" in Journal of Religious History, n° 20, June 1980, pp. 136–46.
 See also Inventaire après décès de Claude Clerselier, Archives nationales, Minutier Central, Étude XXXIX, liasse 159, 10 January 1685.(via T.McC.)

References 

French publishers (people)
17th-century French writers
17th-century French male writers
Writers from Paris
1614 births
1684 deaths